The chapters of the Japanese manga series Akagi: Yami ni Oritatta Tensai are written and illustrated by Nobuyuki Fukumoto. They were serialized in Takeshobo's magazine Kindai Mahjong between June 1, 1991, and February 1, 2018. They were later compiled by Takeshobo into 36 tankōbon collected volumes and released between April 24, 1992, and June 27, 2018.

Two spin-off manga written and illustrated by Keiichirō Hara and focused on the main character's rival, Iwao Washizu, were also released.  was serialized in Monthly Kindai Mahjong Original starting on June 28, 2008. The series spawned eight volumes released between February 17, 2009, and January 26, 2013. The series, that explores the past of Washizu, concluded as the fourth volume was released on May 15, 2015.

Volume list

Akagi: Yami ni Oritatta Tensai

Washizu: Enma no Tōhai

Washizu: Tenka Sōsei Tōhairoku

References

External links
 
 

Akagi